The 2017 Novak Djokovic tennis season began on 1 January 2017 with the start of the Qatar ExxonMobil Open and ended with a quarterfinal loss at the 2017 Wimbledon Championships in July.

Yearly summary

Asian/Pacific hard court season and Australian Open

Qatar Open 
Djokovic's first tournament of the season was in Qatar, where he was the defending champion. In his semi-final match against Fernando Verdasco, Djokovic saved five match points, eventually winning in three sets. He would go on to win the tournament defeating long-time rival and the number one ranked Andy Murray in the final.

Australian Open
In Melbourne, Djokovic won his first round match against Verdasco in straight sets. In the Round of 64, he was upset in five sets by Denis Istomin. He was up 2 sets to 1 and was 3 points from the win in the fourth set. The loss marked Djokovic's earliest exit at a Grand Slam event since Wimbledon in 2008, and his earliest in Australia when he lost in the first round in 2006.

North American spring hard court season

Mexican Open
Djokovic accepted a wild card and made his ATP World Tour debut in Latin America. He started in Acapulco with a tough first round win against Martin Klizan. Djokovic next got the better of Juan Martin Del Potro after losing the first set. Djokovic then lost to Nick Kyrgios in straight sets.

Indian Wells Masters 
Djokovic beat British Kyle Edmund in the second round and del Potro with a strong third set in the third round. The win over del Potro gave Djokovic his 19th consecutive win at Indian Wells, the longest win streak in the event's 43-year history. The streak was then ended, as Djokovic was beaten again by Kyrgios who overpowered him with first and second serves and a varied overall game.

European clay court season

Monte-Carlo Masters 
Djokovic was hanging onto a thread throughout the tournament till the quarterfinals where that thread was cut by Belgian David Goffin, where he lost in 3 tight sets.

Madrid Open 
Djokovic beat Spaniards Nicolas Almagro and Feliciano Lopez in succession before receiving a walkover when Kei Nishikori withdrew with a wrist injury. Rafael Nadal then ended his seven match losing streak against Djokovic with a comprehensive straight sets win.

Italian Open 
Djokovic successfully defended his 2016 point total by reaching the final after straight set victories over Aljaž Bedene, Roberto Bautista-Agut, Juan Martin del Potro, and Dominic Thiem. However, Djokovic was then stopped by 20-year-old Alexander Zverev Jr. in the final. Shortly after the match, Djokovic confirmed a coaching partnership with Andre Agassi, beginning at Roland-Garros.

French Open 
Djokovic was the defending champion. He made it to the quarter-finals, losing to Dominic Thiem in straight sets including a bagel in the final set.

Grass court season

Eastbourne International 
Djokovic took a wild card in an effort to pick up some match play on grass. It was the first grass tune-up ahead of Wimbledon he had played since 2010. Djokovic went on to win the event with four straight-sets wins.

Wimbledon 
Djokovic beat Martin Kližan, Adam Pavlásek and Ernests Gulbis in the first three rounds without dropping a set. In his 4th round match with Adrian Mannarino, both players were forced to move the match to the next day due to a five set battle between Rafael Nadal and Gilles Müller, which ended with less than one hour of playable daylight on a then roofless No. 1 Court, meaning that after beating Mannarino in three sets, Novak had less time to recover for the upcoming quarterfinal match against Tomas Berdych. Fighting with persisting right elbow problems, he criticized Wimbledon organisers for delaying his 4R match instead of moving it to Centre Court. The next day he retired against Tomas Berdych while down 6–7, 0–2, due to an elbow injury.

Injury hiatus 

On July 27, Djokovic announced he would be missing the rest of the season to recover from a persistent injury on his right elbow.

Missing the last four months of the season, Djokovic saw his ranking drop to 12th, the lowest since 2007. This had been the first time Djokovic had to miss a Grand Slam since his first appearance in 2005.

All matches

This table lists all the matches of Djokovic this year, including walkovers W/O (they are marked ND for non-decision)

Singles

Doubles

Tournament schedule

Singles schedule

Yearly records

Head-to-head matchups

Novak Djokovic had a  record against the top 10,  against the top 11–50,  against other players;  against right-handed players and  against left-handed players.
	
Ordered by number of wins (Bolded number marks a top 10 player at the time of first match of the year, Italic means top 50; "L" means left-handed player).

Finals

Singles: 3 (2 titles, 1 runner-up)

Earnings

 Figures in United States dollars (USD) unless noted. 

 Bold denotes tournament win

See also

 2017 ATP World Tour
 2017 Roger Federer tennis season
 2017 Rafael Nadal tennis season
 2017 Andy Murray tennis season
 2017 Stan Wawrinka tennis season

References

External links
  
 ATP tour profile

Novak Djokovic tennis seasons
Djokovic
2017 in Serbian sport